Stanovik may refer to:

Olyokma-Stanovik, a mountain system in northern / central  Zabaykalsky Krai
Olyokma-Stanovik Range, a subrange of the Olyokma-Stanovik
Toko-Stanovik, a subrange of the Stanovoy Range in the border of Amur Oblast, Yakutia and Khabarovsk Krai 
Stanovik Range, a mountain chain in southern Zabaykalsky Krai near the border with Mongolia